Zhang Shuai was the defending champion, but she withdrew before her first round match against Wang Yafan.

Wang Qiang won the title, defeating Yulia Putintseva in the final, 6–1, 6–2.

Seeds

Draw

Finals

Top half

Bottom half

Qualifying

Seeds

Qualifiers

Lucky loser

Qualifying draw

First qualifier

Second qualifier

Third qualifier

Fourth qualifier

Fifth qualifier

Sixth qualifier

External links
 Main draw
 Qualifying draw

Guangzhou International Women's Open - Singles
2018 Singles
2018 in Chinese tennis